The Temple Theatre is an historic performance center in Sanford, Lee County, North Carolina. The Temple Theatre was built in 1925 by Robert Ingram, Sr. (owner of the Sanford Coca-Cola Bottling Company), at a time when Sanford had a population of only 3,500.  The name "Temple" comes from being located next door to what was once Sanford's Masonic Lodge.  The following quote ran in a 1925 issue of the Sanford Express, "In erecting this modern theater, he has spared no expense to make it an up-to-date playhouse."  It is a 50 feet wide-by-92 feet deep, two-story, brick building decorated with cut stone details in a blend of Colonial Revival and Art Deco styles.

For several decades, the Temple served as Lee County, North Carolina's principal seat of entertainment.  Located half a block from the railroad station, the Temple was a frequent for the shows and stars of Vaudeville.  Years later, the Temple became a touring house for the road shows of the 1930s (including burlesque), and then a movie theater.  During the 1960s, the Sanford Little Theatre and the Footlight Players used the Temple for their community productions.  In 1965, the Temple Theatre closed.

The rebirth of the Temple Theatre began in 1981 when Mr. Robert Ingram, Jr., the son of the theatre's original owner, donated the building to the citizens of Lee County.  Through the efforts of Sam Bass, the building was listed on the National Register of Historic Places in 1983 and received a large challenge grant from the North Carolina Legislature.   It is located in the Downtown Sanford Historic District. Lee County citizens and businesses matched the grant, along with a significant grant from the Z. Smith Reynolds Foundation.  The building was gutted and the vandalized shell of Temple Theatre was refurbished with the comfort of both the patron and performer in mind.  In 1984, Temple reopened as a community theater under director Kathy DeNobriga.  The first show at the newly renovated Temple was Chicago. Ticket prices for an individual show were $3 and $4. A season ticket of 4 shows was $12. All shows were produced by the Footlight Players, and The Temple paid the bills and sold the tickets. The staff of the Temple at that time was Kathy DeNobriga, Director; Trip May, Tech Director; Sheila Brewer, Office Manager, Frank Nunally, Bookkeeper and Corrina Wicker, Box Office.  In April 1986, Trip May took another position, and Tim Morrissey was hired as Technical Director.  One of the first things he did was enlist the help of Sam Bass, and the two of them built the cover over the orchestra pit, which is removable.

In 1986 the first "Temple Theatre Day" was instituted. and held around April 1. It was a community and patron focused fundraiser.  Patterned after The United Way's fund raising organization, the first one was chaired by local businessman Lamar Beach.  Funds raised by this scheme were designated for the theatre's staff salaries, insurance and utilities throughout the year.  It continued to be an annual event although the date was later changed to accommodate the theatre's fiscal year change to July 1 to be in line with the State's Art Council grant cycle.

In the summer of 1987 the Temple embarked on its first professional theatre venture, producing three shows in the summer of 1987 using casts and crews that were all paid. There were no union contracts at that time. In February 1988 DeNobriga moved  to Atlanta where she took a position with Alternate Roots, and Morrissey was named Executive/Artistic Producing Director.  In the summer of 1988 another professional show was done. In the Spring of 1990 Wally Eastland was hired as the technical director and Frank Nunally retired.  Brewer took over the duties of the bookkeeper and office manager. Eastland left in 1993 and was replaced by Bill Freeman. Freeman left in 1996 and was replaced by Ron Smith.  Smith left in 2000 and was replaced by Brad Sizemore.

In the summer of 1989 another professional show was produced using contracts with Actors' Equity. In the Spring of 1990 the Temple Board of Directors voted to accept a budget that included salaries for actors during the regular season.   This was essentially the end of 'community' theatre at the Temple, and while various shows continued to use unpaid, local, actors and tech crew, many in those positions were paid- some union wages.  In 1990, David Almond, who had been the musical director for the community theatre was replaced by Bert Fox.  Fox stayed as MD until the summer of 1994, after which Musical Directors were contracted show by show. In the Fall of 1994 Serena Ebhardt became the General Manager. She remained in that position until 2000 when she left to pursue other theatre activities. Kathy Stallings replaced Ebhardt and she left in 2001.   Wicker retired in 1996 and the box office was filled with various part-time help.

In the fall of 1995 the Temple sponsored a community theatre named "The Community Playhouse'.  They produced 1 show a year each September from 1995-1998.

The roof on the theatre was completely replaced in the summer of 1998.  In the Spring of 1996 the balcony was reconfigured, removing two rows of seats and converting the tech office into a reception room. The capacity of the theatre was reduced, and with the addition of computerized box office ticketing,  the theatre seating could be adjusted to allow only 299 seats to be sold, fulfilling an agreement with Actors' Equity for a special contract.

The sound equipment was moved to the balcony in the rear.  It was later found to be unsatisfactory, so a special booth was built out over the audience from the balcony. 
In the Fall of 1997,  a temporary light truss was added to the down stage for the show 'The Invisible Man'.  It was still there in the fall of 2001.

The marquee sign, the copper letters 'TEMPLE',  were constructed by the metal workers at King Roofing in Sanford, in 2000.  They used an old sign that had been there made of galvanized steel.  Morrissey found the old sign while rummaging around in the underground part of the theater.  The new copper sign was paid for as a donation by Dave and Kelly Kurz.

Morrissey left the Temple in Oct 2001, becoming the Executive/Artistic Director  at The Highlands Playhouse in Highlands, NC  and was replaced by Jerry Sipp. Staff at that time was Sipp,  Sizemore, Brewer and part-time help in the box office.

The lobby's richly painted walls and wooden trim flank the original multi-colored floor of hexagonal tiles.  Above hangs a crystal chandelier accented in gold, while twin staircases sweep up on either side of the lobby leading to the balcony where the restored tin ceiling can be best appreciated.  Backstage, the actors enjoy comfortable dressing rooms, a kitchen, and a lounge area.   That's not bad, considering the original structure had one bathroom for the performers and it was located in the basement.  There is a full counterweight fly system backstage, an advanced communication network, and a computer-controlled lighting (last updated in 2010) and sound system (lasted updated in 2014), making the theatre practical and workable.  Originally, the Temple seated 500.  During the 80's renovation process, seating was reduced to 334, making it quite an intimate venue.  The Temple also has an orchestra pit, which is utilized by musicians, but can be covered to create a larger stage.  Because it was designed for vaudeville, the acoustics are superb - highlighted by an ornate painted tin ceiling, and audience members have a good view of the stage from every seat.  In the spring of 2012, the Temple unveiled a brand new concession and restroom area.

The Temple is a cultural center and the top year-round attraction in Lee County.  The North Carolina Shakespeare Festival, the Red Clay Ramblers, The Kingston Trio, the Glenn Miller Band, Count Basie, Mark Wills, The Embers, and Nantucket (band) are among the artists who have performed at the Temple Theatre.

Today, The Temple Theatre Company produces seven Main Stage shows per season ranging from musicals to dramas, with each show running for three weeks.  All the actors are paid professionals brought in from across the country. The Temple Theatre is also a Comedy Zone venue, and has hosted a number of high-profile stand up comics in recent years, including Jimmie Walker, Carlos Mencia, Jon Reep, James Gregory (comedian), and Pauly Shore. Special events at the Temple range from pop concerts to dance recitals.

The Temple attracts patrons from the Research Triangle, the Piedmont Triad, and the Sandhills areas on a regular basis.  In all, around 40,000 people visit the Temple each year.  All funds raised during the annual fund drive go to the maintenance and operation of the facility (utilities, insurance, equipment, security, etc.).  Production expenses come from ticket sales, sponsorships, grants, and advertising.  The Temple Theatre is a non-profit organization.

The full schedule of events at Temple Theatre can be viewed at http://www.templeshows.org.

Current Staff
Peggy Taphorn as Producing Artistic Director
Gavan Pamer as Director of Education and Associate Artistic Director
Ravenne Pantoja as Marketing Director
John Wampler as Technical Director
Tabitha Whitlow as Business Manager
Patrick Holt as Facilities Manager
Jonas Rowland as Production Stage Manager

Board of Directors
President: Bill Gross
Vice President: 
Secretary: Justin Smith
Treasurer: Shay Benton
Dr. Mindy Deason Marlowe
Terry McMillian
David Morse
Dr. Karyn Rahn

References

External links
 The Temple Theatre
 National Register of Historic Places

Theatres on the National Register of Historic Places in North Carolina
Colonial Revival architecture in North Carolina
Art Deco architecture in North Carolina
Theatres completed in 1925
Buildings and structures in Lee County, North Carolina
Tourist attractions in Lee County, North Carolina
Theatres in North Carolina
National Register of Historic Places in Lee County, North Carolina
Individually listed contributing properties to historic districts on the National Register in North Carolina